Pelayo was a battleship of the Spanish Navy which served in the Spanish fleet from 1888 to 1925. She was the first battleship and the most powerful unit of the Spanish Navy at the time. Despite its modern design for the time, Pelayo and the rest of the Spanish Asia-Pacific Rescue Squadron never engaged in combat during the Spanish–American War. Some historians argue the battleship, along with armored cruiser Carlos V, would have changed the course of the war dramatically, leading to a possible Spanish victory, thus consolidating Spain's status as a colonial power.

Technical characteristics

Ordered in November 1884, Pelayo was built by Forges et Chantiers de la Méditerranée at La Seyne in France. Her keel was laid in April 1885, and she was launched on 5 February 1887 and completed in the summer of 1888. She was originally intended to be the first of a new class of battleships, but a crisis with the German Empire in the Caroline Islands in 1890 led to the cancellation of these plans and the diversion of funds to the construction of the Infanta Maria Teresa-class armored cruisers. Pelayo was viewed as too slow and having too little coal endurance for colonial service, and ended up being the only member of her class.

The design of Pelayo was based on that of the French battleship Marceau, modified to give her a draft that was  shallower so that she could transit the Suez Canal at full load displacement. Originally equipped with sails, she had them deleted soon after completion. She had two funnels. Her  gun was a bow chaser. Internally, she had French-style cellular construction with 13 watertight bulkheads and a double bottom.

She was a barbette ship, an ancestor of the modern battleship with the main battery mounted in open barbettes on armored rotating platforms, in contrast to the heavy self-contained turrets more common to the period, in favor of which the progress of the design of modern battleships would soon abandon the barbette design.

Her main guns could be loaded in any position, and consisted of two Gonzalez Hontoria-built  Canet guns mounted fore and aft on the centerline and two Gonzalez Hontoria  guns, also in barbettes, with one mounted on either beam

Pelayo was reconstructed at La Seyne in 1897–1898, receiving armor for her midships battery and having her  guns replaced by  pieces, one mounted as a bow chaser and the rest on the broadside. However, the installation of these new guns was disrupted and delayed when she was rushed back into service after the Spanish–American War began.

During a major refit in 1910, her torpedo tubes were removed.

Operational history

Pelayo spent her early years in Spanish waters, showing the flag in various naval reviews and exhibitions, notably in Greece in 1891, at Genoa, Italy, in 1892, and Kiel, Germany, in 1895.

She began a reconstruction at La Seyne in 1897, and was there when the Spanish–American War broke out in April 1898. She was rushed back into service with her old  guns removed but her new  guns not yet mounted, and entered service with the Reserve Squadron on 14 May 1898.

She remained in Spanish waters for a month to guard against United States Navy raids against the Spanish coast. She then was assigned to the 2nd Squadron, commanded by Rear Admiral Manuel de Cámara, which was to steam to the Philippines and defeat the U.S. Navy's Asiatic Squadron, which had controlled Philippine waters since defeating the Spanish squadron of Rear Admiral Patricio Montojo y Pasaron in the Battle of Manila Bay.

Cámara's squadron—consisting of Pelayo, armored cruiser Emperador Carlos V, auxiliary cruisers Patriota and Rapido, destroyers Audaz, Osado, and Prosepina, and transports Buenos Aires and Panay—sortied from Cadiz on 16 June 1898, passing Gibraltar on 17 June 1898. It arrived at Port Said, Egypt, on 26 June 1898, and requested permission to transship coal, which the Egyptian government finally denied on 30 June 1898 out of concern for Egyptian neutrality. By the time Cámara's squadron arrived at Suez on 5 July 1898, the squadron of Vice Admiral Pascual Cervera y Topete had been annihilated in the Battle of Santiago de Cuba, freeing up the U.S. Navy's heavy forces from the blockade of Santiago de Cuba. Fearful for the security of the Spanish coast, the Spanish Ministry of Marine recalled Cámara's squadron on 7 July 1898, and Pelayo returned to Spain, where Cámara's 2nd Squadron was dissolved on 25 July 1898. Pelayo spent the last month of the war in Spanish waters, and thus missed combat.

After the war, she resumed her duty of showing the flag, attending naval reviews in Toulon, France, in 1901 and in Lisbon, Portugal, and Vigo Bay, Spain, in 1904. But the Spanish Navy found it difficult to find a role for Pelayo, which had no similar ships with which to operate. There was thought of having her operate with Spain's new dreadnoughts España-class battleship when they began to commission during the World War I era, but by then she was too old and slow to be compatible with them. She thus earned the nickname Solitario, meaning "The Lonely One."

Pelayo fired her guns in anger only once, when she bombarded Moroccan insurgents in 1909 during the Second Rif War.

Pelayo underwent a major refit in 1910. In 1912, she was badly damaged in Fonduko Bay due to a navigational error. She was repaired, but thereafter served as a training ship, including service in 1920 and 1921 as a gunnery training ship in the Training Division. Pelayo was disarmed in 1923 and scrapped in 1925.

References

Bibliography
 Cervera y Topete, Pascual. Office of Naval Intelligence War Notes No. VII: Information From Abroad: The Spanish–American War: A Collection of Documents Relative to the Squadron Operations in the West Indies, Translated From the Spanish. Washington, D.C.: Government Printing Office, 1899.
 Gibbons, Tony. The Complete Encyclopedia of Battleships and Battlecruisers: A Technical Directory of All the World's Capital Ships From 1860 to the Present Day. London: Salamander Books, Ltd., 1983.
 Gray, Randal, Ed. Conway's All The World's Fighting Ships 1906–1921. Annapolis, Maryland: Naval Institute Press, 1985. .
 Nofi, Albert A. The Spanish–American War, 1898. Conshohocken, Pennsylvania:Combined Books, Inc., 1996. .

External links

 The Spanish–American War Centennial Website: Pelayo

Battleships of the Spanish Navy
Ships built in France
1887 ships
Maritime incidents in 1912
Spanish–American War battleships of Spain